William Watson (born 31 August 1965) is a former New Zealand cricketer. 

A right-arm fast-medium bowler, Watson played 15 Tests and 61 One Day Internationals for New Zealand between 1986 and 1994. He took his best Test bowling figures of 6 for 78 against Pakistan in Lahore in October 1990.

Watson played first-class cricket for Auckland from 1984–85 to 1994–95. He took his best first-class figures of 7 for 60 in Auckland's innings victory over Central Districts in 1989–90.

Since retiring from cricket, Watson has worked for Lion, Cadbury and DB Breweries and is now National Business Manager for Bic.

References

External links
 

1965 births
Living people
Auckland cricketers
New Zealand One Day International cricketers
New Zealand Test cricketers
New Zealand cricketers
People educated at Westlake Boys High School
North Island cricketers